East Glenn is an unincorporated community in central Lost Creek Township, Vigo County, in the U.S. state of Indiana.

Just outside the boundaries of Terre Haute, it is also part of the Terre Haute metropolitan area.

Geography

References

Unincorporated communities in Indiana
Unincorporated communities in Vigo County, Indiana
Terre Haute metropolitan area